The Saskatoon Farmers' Market is a profit, vendor-owned cooperative that operates year-round, twice-weekly Farmers' market in Saskatoon, Saskatchewan, Canada. Featuring more than 100 vendors and resolutely supporting local makers, bakers, gatherers, and growers, the Saskatoon Farmers’ Market is a true and authentic farmers’ market. In addition to its year-round weekend markets at 2600 Koyl Ave, the Saskatoon Farmers' Market also operates seasonally on Wednesday evenings at the Spiffy Car Wash (600 Melville St.) in Stonebridge. It also operates a virtual market online.

Early locations for the market
The Saskatoon Farmers’ Market Cooperative was originally called the Toad Lane Market. The SFM was established in 1975 (with a $1,000 grant from the Ministry of Agriculture). Prior to moving to 2600 Koyl Avenue, the Saskatoon Farmers' Market operated at several locations:

 Summer Market operated from City Hall Parking Lot (1975–1980), 23rd Street (1980–1993), 23rd Street and City Hall Square.
 Summer Satellite Market (on Thursdays) operated from parking lots at the Westgate Plaza (1978), Confederation Mall Parking Lot (1979–1999), and 51st Street (1999–2007).
 Summer Satellite Market (on Tuesdays) operated from parking lots at the Wildwood Mall (1982–1990), College Park Mall (1990–1999), Elm Church parking lot (1999–2002), Lakewood Civic Centre (2002–2007).
 Winter Markets operated from the Sinclair Centre (1977–1987), Sturdy Stone Centre, and the Adilman Building.
 A city-owned building in Riversdale (2007 to 2019). When the Saskatoon Farmers’ Market moved to Riversdale, the cooperative agreed to discontinue market operations at other locations, as desired by the City of Saskatoon to further the goals of the City of Saskatoon related to neighbourhood success. At the time, the location was intended to be the permanent home for the Saskatoon Farmers’ Market, but City of Saskatoon planning decisions necessitated a move.

External links
https://www.saskatoonfarmersmarket.com/
https://www.localline.ca/stoonfarmersmkt

Buildings and structures in Saskatoon
Farmers' markets in Canada
Agricultural cooperatives in Canada
Tourist attractions in Saskatoon
1975 establishments in Saskatchewan
Food and drink in Saskatchewan
Culture of Saskatoon